James Garver (born September 8, 1957) is a country music guitarist.  Garver is credited with referencing the bar "The Oasis" (after a closed establishment in his hometown of Concordia, Kansas) in the song Friends in Low Places made famous by Garth Brooks. Garver toured extensively with Brooks and as of 2012, Garver has been credited with 25 different albums with roles ranging from musician to composer.

Biography
Garver grew up in Concordia, Kansas with his parents, Don and Donna. Garver played in several bands, including the KFDI Ranchhouse Swing Band for about a year, before moving to Nashville, Tennessee. He was working full-time as a bricklayer, and playing in a local band, in 1988 when he attended a writers' showcase one night at the Bluebird Cafe and met Garth Brooks. That same week, after learning that Brooks worked at a boot store, Garver went to the store and the two talked music again. Brooks invited Garver to join his band in May. 
Shortly afterwards, Garver introduced Brooks to steel guitarist Steve McClure, a fellow Kansan, who also joined Brooks' band, now named Stillwater. Within two months, Brooks signed with Capitol Records.
Garver recalled, "I originally started out as a fiddle player for him and he ended up liking my guitar playing better, so that's where I ended up." He added, "I was just happy to have a job." 
In subsequent years, Garver provided backing vocals and played lead electric guitar, acoustic guitar, banjo, piano, and percussion.

Mr. Garver has not performed as a musician since 2000. He and his wife Lana now own and operate Garver Builders, LLC, a commercial and industrial building contractor and developer, in Gallatin, Tennessee.

Discography

References

External links
 Jim Garver guitar solo tribute YouTube

American country guitarists
American male guitarists
Living people
Guitarists from Kansas
People from Concordia, Kansas
1957 births